The District of Pristina is a district in Kosovo. Its seat is the capital city of Pristina. It consists of eight municipalities and 298 villages. According to the 2011 census, the total population of the district is 477,312.

Municipalities
The district of Pristina has a total of eight municipalities and 298 other smaller settlements:

Ethnic groups

In 1991, the municipalities with an Albanian majority were: Pristina (88.63%), Obilić (80.31%), Kosovo Polje (82.63%), Lipljan (79.36%), Podujevo (98.91%), and Drenas (99.87%). The municipality of Novo Brdo had a Serb-Montenegrin majority in 1991 (58.12%).

In the 2011 census, Albanians are the majority in: Pristina (97.8%), Drenas (99.9%), Podujevo (98.9%), Lipjan (94.6%), Obiliq (92.1%), Kosovo Polje (86.9%), and Novo Brdo (52.4%).

Serbs are the majority population in Gračanica municipality with 67.5%.

Ethnic groups in 2011 census:

Postal codes

See also
Subdivisions of Kosovo

Notes

References

External links
Municipality Of Pristina